Gina Zurlo is an American historian, sociologist and a scholar of history of mission and world Christianity. She is a Visiting Research Fellow at Boston University Institute on Culture, Religion and World Affairs. She co-founded the Center for the Study of Global Christianity based in Gordon-Conwell Theological Seminary, South Hamilton, Massachusetts. Zurlo was named in the BBC 100 most inspiring and influential women from around the world in 2019 for her work in religious statistics and female future of religion.

Education 
Zurlo studied for her Ph.D. in History and Hermeneutics at Boston University School of Theology under the direction of Dana Robert and graduated in 2017. Her dissertation was focused on the role of quantification in the development of world Christianity, with special focus on the work of Anglican missionary to Kenya, David B. Barrett.

Career 
Zurlo teaches American religious history, World Christianity and Women in World Christianity at Gordon-Conwell. She is a member of the Society for the Scientific Study of Religion and the Religious Research Association. She is a co-editor of the World Religion Database (Brill).

References

Living people
Year of birth missing (living people)
American sociologists
American Christian writers
Boston University alumni
Gordon–Conwell Theological Seminary faculty